Thomas Wolfe III (born October 24, 1988) is an American football defensive back who is currently a free agent. He played college football at Fort Valley State University and attended Joseph Wheeler High School in Marietta, Georgia.

Early life
Wolfe attended Joseph Wheeler High School where he starred football, basketball, and baseball.

College career
Wolfe played for the Reedley Tigers from 2007 to 2009. Wolfe transferred to Midwestern State played in 2010 with the Mustangs before he tore his Achilles tendon. Wolfe played for the Fort Valley State Wildcats in 2013. He played in 12 games during his career including 9 starts at cornerback. Wolfe was named a First-team All-Southern Intercollegiate Athletic Conference selection and HBCU All-American following the 2013 season.

Professional career

Seattle Seahawks
Wolfe signed with the Seattle Seahawks as an undrafted free agent. Wolfe was waived on August 6, 2014. Wolfe was re-signed on August 10, 2014 and waived again on August 25.

Washington Redskins
Wolfe was signed to the Washington Redskins practice squad on November 26, 2014. He was waived on May 4, 2015. Wolfe was re-signed by the Redskins on May 28, 2015.

Hamilton Tiger-Cats
Wolfe was signed by the Hamilton Tiger-Cats on May 28, 2016. He was waived on June 20, 2016.

Los Angeles KISS
On July 7, 2016, Wolfe was assigned to the Los Angeles KISS.

Tampa Bay Storm
On October 14, 2016, Wolfe was assigned to the Tampa Bay Storm. On January 5, 2017, Wolfe had his rookie option exercised by the Storm.

Baltimore Brigade
On February 24, 2017, Wolfe was traded to the Baltimore Brigade for claim order positioning and future considerations.

Washington Valor
On April 2, 2019, Wolfe was assigned to the Washington Valor.

References

External links
 Midwestern State Mustangs bio
 Fort Valley State Wildcats bio

Living people
1988 births
Players of American football from Marietta, Georgia
American football defensive backs
Canadian football defensive backs
American players of Canadian football
Reedley Tigers football players
Midwestern State Mustangs football players
Fort Valley State Wildcats football players
Seattle Seahawks players
Washington Redskins players
Hamilton Tiger-Cats players
Los Angeles Kiss players
Tampa Bay Storm players
Baltimore Brigade players
Washington Valor players